The Palmophyllophyceae are a proposed basal Chlorophyte clade consisting of the Palmophyllales and Prasinococcales.

References

 
Green algae classes